Net Worth is a 2000 drama film that starred Todd Field, Craig Sheffer, Daniel Baldwin,  Michael T. Weiss, Tara Wood, Ernie Garrett, and Alix Koromzay. It was directed by Kenny Griswold from a script written by Kenny Griswold and Bill Kerig.

Plot
Four competitive friends agree to a bet: they will all go to a city where none of them know anybody, with only $100 in their pockets. As the winner will be the person who has the greatest net worth at the end of 30 days. Despite all having a different philosophy about work and wealth they all believe they will win the bet.

References

External links 

2000 films
2000 drama films
2000s English-language films